Kerry McAleer-Keeler (b. 1971) is an American book artist, printmaker and educator. She attended Mount Holyoke College and George Washington University. Her 2007 artist's book, Gifts from Our Elders, is in the Smithsonian Libraries and Archives. She provided illustrations for the collaborative book Uncovering white privilege : a primer which is in the collection of the University of Puget Sound Artists' Books Collection. Her 2011 book [For the birds] is in the National Museum of Women in the Arts.

Her work was included in the 2020 exhibition Sea Change at the Washington Printmakers Gallery. Her work was in the exhibition Paper Boats 2021 at the Los Angeles Printmaking Society. She teaches at the Corcoran School of the Arts and Design.

References

External links
 Official website

1971 births
Living people
Printmakers
Women book artists
21st-century American women artists
Artists from Washington, D.C.
Mount Holyoke College alumni
George Washington University alumni
Corcoran School of the Arts and Design faculty